Satoko (さとこ, サトコ) is a Japanese female given name.

Possible Writings
Satoko can be written using different kanji characters and can mean:
聡子 "wise, child"
智子 "wisdom, child"
里子 "village, child"
理子 "logic, child"
悟子 "enlightened, child"

The name can also be written in hiragana or katakana.

People
Satoko Inoue, a pianist
Satoko Fujii, an avant-garde jazz pianist and composer
Satoko Akiyama, a Japanese pop artist
, Japanese swimmer
, Japanese gymnast
Satoko Sakamoto, murdered by members of Aum Shinrikyo along with her husband, Tsutsumi Sakamoto, who was a lawyer working on a class action lawsuit against Aum Shinrikyo, and her child
Satoko Kuni, daughter of Prince Kuni Kuniyoshi and sister of Empress Kōjun, the mother of Akihito
Satoko Takita, chairwoman of Mozilla Japan
Satoko Nishikawa, singer of Shang Shang Typhoon
Princess Satoko, daughter of Prince Kaya Kuninori
Satoko Miyachi, character designer for Madlax
Satoko Okudera, screenwriter of The Girl Who Leapt Through Time and Summer Wars
Satoko, wife of Tokugawa Hidetada, the second Tokugawa shōgun of Japan
Satoko Tsushima, a contemporary Japanese fiction writer, essayist and critic
, Japanese swimmer
Satoko Makishi, a Japanese pop singer
Anekōji Satoko, a lady-in-waiting at the court of Emperor Kōkaku
Satoko Morikawa, character designer for The Cat Returns
Satoko Kashikawa, producer of 1 Litre of Tears
Satoko Kizaki, author, won the Akutagawa Prize for Blue Paulownia (Aogiri)
Satoko Shinashi, mixed martial arts fighter
Satoko Miyahara, a Japanese figure skater
Satoko Kamoshida (鴨志田 聡子), born 1979, a Yiddish Scholar at the University of Tokyo

Fictional characters
Satoko Yamano from Oh My Goddess!
Satoko Ayakura from The Sea of Fertility
Satoko Houjou from Higurashi no Naku Koro ni
A character from The Sound of the Mountain
Satoko Shimoyanagi from Churasan 3
Asai Satoko from Friends (2002 TV series)
A character from Strawberry Shortcakes
Satoko Takanashi from Gate Keepers
Satoko Kayama, a minor character in the Paranoia Agent episode "Mellow Maromi"
When Ash was crossdressed in Pokémon, Ash (Satoshi) was called 'Satoko (Ashley)'
Satoko Sasauchi, a character from Strike Witches

Japanese feminine given names